Humpty Dumpty is a bimonthly American magazine for children 2 to 6 years old that takes its title from the nursery rhyme of the same name. The magazine features short stories, poems, nonfiction articles, games, comics, recipes, crafts, and more. Having been continuously produced for more than 65 years, it is one of the oldest American magazines for kids.

Mission
As part of the Children’s Better Health Institute—a division of the Saturday Evening Post Society Inc., a 501 (c)(3) nonprofit charitable organization—Humpty Dumpty’s mission is to promote the healthy physical, educational, creative, social, and emotional growth of children in a format that is engaging, stimulating, and entertaining for children ages 2 to 6.

History

Humpty Dumpty Magazine (then called Humpty Dumpty’s Magazine) was launched by George J. Hecht and Parents magazine in October 1952. Originally, it was a sister publication to Children's Digest, aimed at a younger audience than the latter publication. The first editor of Humpty Dumpty was Harold Schwartz. Another early editor was the children's book author Alvin Tresselt.  In January 1980, both Humpty Dumpty and Children’s Digest came under the ownership of the nonprofit Saturday Evening Post Society. When Children's Digest was merged with Jack and Jill in 2009, Humpty Dumpty was continued.

Today, Jennifer Burnham edits Humpty Dumpty under the direction of Steven Slon. Humpty Dumpty is one of two children's publications in the U.S. Kids family of magazines, which are published by the Children’s Better Health Institute, a division of the nonprofit Saturday Evening Post Society. Its sister publication under the U.S. Kids banner is Jack and Jill (for children ages 6 to 12).

Features
 U.S. Kids Cover Contest: Humpty Dumpty holds an annual themed cover contest in which readers submit their artwork. The winning entry is featured on the front cover, with second-, third-place, and Readers’ Choice winners’ art showcased inside the same issue. In addition, U.S. Kids also recognizes winners’ art departments and teachers with cash awards to help support their programs. School art programs have been awarded more than $25,000 from the contest so far.
 Build-a-Book: Each issue of Humpty comes with a mini-book that kids can cut out, put together, and collect. The age-appropriate book encourages independent reading.
 Games/Puzzles: Humpty Dumpty offers a variety of puzzles and games, which promote problem-solving and independent thinking.
 Amazing Animals: Each issue focuses on a creature from the animal kingdom, including facts and photos.

Notable contributors
 Margaret Wise Brown, author of children’s literature, including Goodnight Moon and The Runaway Bunny
 Lilian Moore, poet, children’s author, and editor
 Mathematics and science writer Martin Gardner was a contributing editor to Humpty Dumpty for eight years in the 1950s, creating the activity features and writing short stories about the adventures of Humpty Dumpty, Jr., as well as poems of moral advice.
 Charles Ghigna (“Father Goose”), poet and children’s book author of 100 award-winning books, including a Pulitzer Prize nomination for Returning to Earth, served on Humpty Dumpty’s editorial advisory board and has had his work published in the magazine.
 Eileen Spinelli, poet and author of more than 65 books for children. Since her debut in 1991 with Somebody Loves You, Mr. Hatch, an IRA/CBC Children's Choice book and Christopher Award winner, Spinelli has gone on to author numerous picture books, poetry collections, and chapter books, including the best-selling When Mama Comes Home Tonight and the critically acclaimed Sophie's Masterpiece.
 Comic book writer Justin Gray contributed scripts for Humpty Dumpty’s comics pages for several years.

Awards
 Parents’ Choice Award Recommended Winner, 2017
 Parents’ Choice Award Approved Winner, 2012
 Association of Educational Publishers Distinguished Achievement Award for “Autumn Moon,” 2011
 Parents’ Choice Approved Award Winner, 2011
 iParenting Media Awards Best Product Winner, 2009

References

External links
 Official web site

1952 establishments in Indiana
Bimonthly magazines published in the United States
Children's magazines published in the United States
Magazines established in 1952
Magazines published in Indianapolis